The Abt-Audi TT-R DTM is a 2-door touring car (DTM) constructed by the German car manufacturer Audi. It was first developed for use in the 2000 DTM season, and raced until the end of the 2003 season. It was based on the Audi TT road car.

References

External links

Abt-Audi TT-R DTM
Deutsche Tourenwagen Masters cars